The 2023 Pepperdine Waves men's volleyball team represents Pepperdine University in the 2023 NCAA Division I & II men's volleyball season. The Waves, led by first year head coach Jonathan Winder, play their home games at Firestone Fieldhouse. The Waves are members of the MPSF and were picked to finish second in the preseason poll.

Season highlights
Will be filled in as the season progresses.

Roster

Schedule
TV/Internet Streaming information:
All home games will be televised on WaveCasts. All road games will also be streamed by the schools tv or streaming service. The conference tournament will be streamed by FloVolleyball. 

 *-Indicates conference match. (#)-Indicates tournament seeding.
 Times listed are Pacific Time Zone.

Announcers for televised games

Lincoln Memorial: Al Epstein
The Master's: Al Epstein
Emmanuel: Al Epstein
Princeton: Al Epstein
Penn State: Rob Espero & Bill Walton 
Lewis: Rob Espero & Bill Walton
George Mason: 
UC Santa Barbara: 
UC Santa Barbara: 
UC Irvine: 
UC Irvine: 
Stanford: 
Stanford: 
Grand Canyon: 
Grand Canyon: 
Hawai'i: 
Hawai'i: 
USC: 
USC: 
Harvard: 
Daemen: 
BYU: 
BYU: 
Cal Lutheran: 
Concordia Irvine: 
Concordia Irvine: 
UCLA: 
UCLA: 
MPSF Quarterfinal:

Rankings 

^The Media did not release a Pre-season or Week 1 poll.

References

2023 in sports in California
2023 NCAA Division I & II men's volleyball season
2023 Mountain Pacific Sports Federation volleyball season